James Higgins Laing (1897 – 23 April 1917) was a Scottish footballer who made one appearance in the Scottish League for Falkirk as an inside right.

Personal life 
Prior to his service in the First World War, Laing worked as an engineer for Carron Company. He attested in the Army on 8 December 1915 and was called up to the Argyll and Sutherland Highlanders in September 1916. Serving as a private, Laing was posted to the Western Front in January 1917 and was hospitalised the following month, suffering from frostbite. He returned to his battalion in April and ten days later, on 23 April 1917, he was killed in an attack on Rœux during the Battle of the Scarpe. Laing was buried in Rœux British Cemetery.

Career statistics

References 

Scottish footballers
Scottish Football League players
Association football inside forwards
East Stirlingshire F.C. players
Falkirk F.C. players
People from Kilsyth
1897 births
1917 deaths
British Army personnel of World War I
Argyll and Sutherland Highlanders soldiers
British military personnel killed in World War I
Scottish expatriates in France
Footballers from North Lanarkshire